The Grindstone Indian Rancheria of Wintun-Wailaki Indians is a federally recognized tribe and ranchería of Wintun and Wailaki Indians from northern California.  As of the 2010 Census the population was 164.

Reservation

The tribe's reservation is the Grindstone Rancheria, located in Glenn County, California. It  was founded in 1907 and is  large. Approximately 98 of the tribe's 162 members live on the rancheria. The nearest outside community is Elk Creek, about 5 miles to the south.

Education
The reservation is served by the Stony Creek Joint Unified School District.

Government
The Grindstone Indian Rancheria is governed by a democratically elected tribal council. They are headquartered in Elk Creek, California, and their current tribal chairperson is Ronald Kirk.

Language
Traditionally, the members of tribe spoke the Wailaki language or the Wintun, a Wintuan language of the Penutian language family, but the former is extinct and the latter has few speakers.

Notes

References
 Hinton, Leanne. Flutes of Fire: Essays on California Indian Languages. Berkeley: Heyday Books, 1994. .
 Pritzker, Barry M. A Native American Encyclopedia: History, Culture, and Peoples. Oxford: Oxford University Press, 2000. .

Wintun
Native American tribes in California
Federally recognized tribes in the United States
1907 establishments in California